Six-plus hold 'em (also known as short-deck hold 'em and Manila) is a community card poker game variant of Texas hold 'em, where the 2 through 5 cards are removed from the deck. Each player is dealt two cards face down and seeks to make the best five card poker hand from any combination of the seven cards (five community cards and their own two hole cards).

Rules
The rules in terms of betting structures, play of the hand, and showdown are the same as in Texas hold 'em. However before play begins all cards 2 through 5 are removed (16 cards), thus the total number of cards in the deck is 36. Aces are high, but same as in Texas hold 'em, can make both low and high end of straights. For example the lowest straight would be (9x-8x-7x-6x-Ax) and the highest (Ax-Kx-Qx-Jx-10x). This changes the probability of hands and alters hand rankings.

Modified hand rankings

† Flush ranks higher than full house. In theory, three-of-a-kind ranks higher than a straight as the probability of achieving three-of-a-kind is lower than a straight in short-deck, however recent games have been ranking straight higher than three-of-a-kind which has become standard. Some variations of six-plus hold 'em plays with standard Texas hold 'em hand rankings. When calculating for 5 card six-plus hold 'em where each player gets only 5 cards, straights rank higher than three-of-a-kind.

The 2018 Triton Poker tournament series hosted the first televised six-plus hold 'em tournaments. The first Triton Super High Roller HK$250,000 short deck ante-only event was won by Phil Ivey, earning him US$617,396. The 2018 Triton tournaments ranked straights higher than three-of-a-kind.

History
Also known as, Manila, since 2010 or prior. This game is popular in Australia and among high stakes gamblers in Asia. 

In 2015, Phil Ivey and Tom Dwan promoted the game in an online video showing this variant of Texas hold 'em which is frequently played in Macau, Hong Kong and Manila.

Notes

External links 
 Six Plus Hold'em on PokerNews
 Beginners Tips on Sixplusholdem.com

Poker variants